Katharine Anne Scott Hayhoe (born 1972) is a Canadian atmospheric scientist. She is a Paul Whitfield Horn Distinguished Professor and an Endowed Chair in Public Policy and Public Law in the Texas Tech University Department of Political Science. In 2021, Hayhoe joined the Nature Conservancy as Chief Scientist.

Early life and education
Hayhoe was born on April 15, 1972, in Toronto, Ontario. Her father, Doug Hayhoe, was a science educator and missionary. When Hayhoe was nine, her family moved to Cali, Colombia, where her parents served as missionaries and educators.

Hayhoe received her Bachelor of Science degree in physics and astronomy from the University of Toronto in 1994. She began her college career studying astrophysics, but upon taking a course on climate science to fulfill a course requirement, she shifted her focus to atmospheric science, which she ultimately specialized in at graduate school.

Hayhoe attended graduate school at the University of Illinois at Urbana-Champaign, where she received her Master of Science and Doctor of Philosophy. Her PhD committee was chaired by Donald Wuebbles, who recruited her for a research project assessing the health of the Great Lakes. Wuebbles also introduced her to the Union of Concerned Scientists, a nonprofit science advocacy organization.

Personal life
Hayhoe, who is an evangelical Christian, is the daughter of missionaries. She has stated that admitting her life as a Christian and a scientist is "like coming out of the closet". Her father, Doug Hayhoe, is a former science and technology coordinator for the Toronto District School Board, and is currently an associate professor of education at Tyndale University College and Seminary in Toronto. Hayhoe credits her father as an inspiration with regard to her belief that science and religion do not have to conflict with one another.

She met her husband, Andrew Farley, while doing graduate studies at the University of Illinois. Farley is an Associate Professor of Applied Linguistics at Texas Tech University, and the Lead Pastor of Church Without Religion, an evangelical church in Lubbock, Texas.

Research career 
Hayhoe has worked at Texas Tech since 2005. She has authored more than 120 peer-reviewed publications. She also co-authored some reports for the US Global Change Research Program, as well as some National Academy of Sciences reports, including the third National Climate Assessment, released on May 6, 2014. Shortly after the report was released, Hayhoe said, "Climate change is here and now, and not in some distant time or place," adding that, "The choices we're making today will have a significant impact on our future." She has also served as an expert reviewer for the Intergovernmental Panel on Climate Change's Fourth Assessment Report.

On September 16, 2019, Hayhoe was named one of the United Nations Champions of the Earth in the science and innovation category.

Climate communications 
In addition to her research on climate change, Hayhoe is known for her communication around climate change and her advocacy efforts around climate action. Professor John Abraham has called her "perhaps the best communicator on climate change." Time magazine listed her among the 100 most influential people in 2014. In 2014, the American Geophysical Union awarded her its climate communications award. Hayhoe has also appeared at the White House with former President Barack Obama and the actor Leonardo DiCaprio at the first South by South Lawn festival.

Hayhoe has been very critical of Climate Deniers.  On September 28, 2018, she said, "The six stages of climate denial are: It's not real. It's not us. It's not that bad. It's too expensive to fix. Aha, here's a great solution (that actually does nothing). And – oh no! Now it's too late. You really should have warned us earlier."

Outreach to Christian communities 
In 2009, she and her husband, Andrew Farley, co-authored a book called A Climate for Change: Global Warming Facts for Faith-Based Decisions, which outlines the ways in which climate science reflects conservative Christian beliefs. The book resulted in word-of-mouth referrals across various Christian communities, who began to invite Hayhoe to speak at Christian colleges, churches, and other conservative groups. In the book, she stated that acceptance of climate change does not mean "that we have to believe in evolution or a four billion year old earth". Notably, when Hayhoe first met her husband and co-author, he was skeptical of global warming, but shifted his views. She notes that she was able to change his mind over the course of a year and a half, with the help of data collected on a NASA website that documents rising global temperatures over time. Hayhoe has recognized that those debates with her husband sharpened her skills as a communicator engaging audiences skeptical of climate science.

The effectiveness of her outreach efforts to Christian communities have been the subject of study. She delivers lectures that are rooted in scripture and focus on the benefits of collective action to mitigate the effects of climate change. A 2017 study tested the effectiveness of a climate lecture Hayhoe delivered to students at the predominantly evangelical school Houghton College, in which she devoted time to a discussion of theology-based ethics and delivered information about climate change through a lens of evangelical tradition. Following her lecture, students exhibited more willingness to accept that global warming is a true phenomenon and had an increased awareness of the expert scientific consensus. In an interview with ThinkProgress, Hayhoe notes: "When we tie that to our Christian values there’s no conflict. In fact, quite the opposite – our faith demands that we act on this issue."

Television and video 
In 2014, Hayhoe served as a science advisor to the documentary TV series Years of Living Dangerously, an Emmy Award–winning Showtime series that details how climate change has already impacted lives around the world. She was featured in the first episode of the series, meeting with actor Don Cheadle to discuss why she believed her Christian faith and her belief in the need to act on climate were not at odds.

Hayhoe also hosted and produced a bi-weekly web series with PBS called Global Weirding: Climate, Politics, and Religion, which launched September 2016 and ran through March 2019.

Newt Gingrich book
Hayhoe wrote a chapter of a book by Newt Gingrich about climate change in 2009, and, in 2011, was told by Gingrich's co-author, Terry Maple, that it had been accepted. Gingrich announced in late 2011 that this chapter was dropped on his request, saying, "We didn't know that they were doing that, and we told them to kill it."

Upon finding out that her chapter had been dropped, Hayhoe stated, "I had not heard that" and tweeted that she had spent over 100 unpaid hours working on the chapter. Some have speculated that Gingrich dropped her chapter because Marc Morano, who is not a scientist, wrote many articles on his website, Climate Depot, attacking her findings. This, as well as her appearing on Bill O'Reilly's TV show, led to her receiving nearly 200 hate-mail messages the following day. Shortly after, the conservative political action committee American Tradition Institute filed a request under the Freedom of Information Act for Hayhoe's public university employer to  release her notes and emails related to the writing of the unpublished chapter for the Gingrich book.

Works

Awards and honors 
Katharine Hayhoe is the recipient of the Lifetime Achievement Award (Champions of the Earth) in 2019.
 United Nations Champions of the Earth, 2019
 Foreign Policy magazine 100 Leading Global Thinkers, 2019
 Stephen H. Schneider Award for Outstanding Science Communication, 2018
 Fortune magazine's 50 World's Great Leaders, 2017
 National Center for Science Education Friend of the Planet award, 2016
 Time magazine's 100 Most Influential People, 2014
 American Geophysical Union Climate Communications Prize, 2014

References

External links
 
 Faculty profile
 
 Interview with Krista Tippett, October 21, 2021

1972 births
21st-century Canadian scientists
21st-century Canadian women scientists
21st-century Protestants
Canadian atmospheric scientists
Canadian emigrants to the United States
Canadian evangelicals
Canadian political scientists
Christian scholars
Climate communication
Living people
Science communicators
Scientists from Toronto
Texas Tech University faculty
University of Illinois Urbana-Champaign alumni
Women atmospheric scientists
Women political scientists
Canadian climatologists